Susanne Antonetta is the pen name of Suzanne Paola (born September 29, 1956, in Georgia), an American poet and author who is most widely known for her book Body Toxic: An Environmental Memoir.  In 2001, Body Toxic was named by the New York Times as a "Notable Book". An excerpt of "Body Toxic" was published as a stand-alone essay which was recognized as a "Notable Essay" in the 1998 Best American Essays 1998 anthology. She has published several prize-winning collections of poems, including Bardo, a Brittingham Prize in Poetry winner, and the poetry books Petitioner, Glass, and most recently The Lives of The Saints. She currently resides in Washington with her husband and adopted son. She is widely published both in newspapers such as The New York Times and The Washington Post, as well as in literary journals including Orion, Brevity, JuxtaProse Literary Magazine, Seneca Review, and Image. She is the current Editor-in-Chief of Bellingham Review.

Early life 
Paola was raised among the New Jersey Pine Barrens, which she later used as the setting for Body Toxic, in one of the most environmentally contaminated counties in the United States. Paola's memoir merges her personal and familial sagas with historical accounts, politics, and environmentalism.

Career 
Paola writes about how the poisoned landscape of her New Jersey childhood devastated her body, causing cardiac arrhythmia, seizures, severe allergies, and sterility. She recounts the story of the Radium Girls, details aspects of the frequent nuclear and industrial waste debacles in New Jersey, and relates these events to her family and neighbors.

Paola's memoir disputes attribution of her afflictions to genetic vulnerability, random chance, or recreational drug use. Vignettes depicting colossal man-made environmental disasters are woven into her story, accenting the recurrent medical catastrophes she endured, including endometriosis, rampant thyroid tumors, a quadruplet pregnancy (without fertility drugs) that ended in miscarriage, numerous growths on her liver and ovarian cysts that necessarily had to be removed, alongside repeated bouts of manic-depression. The latter condition was treated with psychotropic drugs, some of which are derived from the very same dye chemicals dumped, sometimes recklessly, into the environment of southern New Jersey.

Awards

 Notable Essay, Elizabeth, Best American Essays 1998
 Brittingham Prize in Poetry, Bardo, 1998
 New York Times Notable Book, Body Toxic, 2001
 Spirituality & Health|Spiriturality & Health - Best Book of the Year, Body Toxic, 2001
 Library Journal's Ten Best Science Books of the Year, Body Toxic, 2001
 American Book Award, Body Toxic, 2001
 NAMI/Ken Johnson Award, A Mind Apart, 2006
 Pushcart Prize, Hosts, 2012

Bibliography

Creative Nonfiction
Make Me A Mother New York, NY: (W.W. Norton, 2014) 
A Mind Apart: Travels in a Neurodiverse World  New York, NY: (Tarcher/Penguin, 2005) (reprinted 2007) 
Body Toxic: An Environmental Memoir  New York, NY: (Counterpoint, 2001) 
Body Toxic: An Environmental Memoir  (Korean translation, Yeesaw Publishers (Gyeonggi-Do, Korea), 2005)

Poetry collections
The Lives of the Saints  Seattle, WA: (University of Washington Press, 2002)  
Bardo  Madison, WI: (University of Wisconsin Press, 1998)
Glass   Princeton, NJ: (Quarterly Review of Literature Poetry Award Series, 1995)  
Petitioner Seattle, WA: (Owl Creek Press, 1986)

Textbooks
Tell It Slant: Creating, Revising and Publishing Creative Nonfiction (2nd edition of "Tell It Slant: Writing & Shaping Creative Nonfiction") with coauthor Brenda Miller. New York, NY: (McGraw-Hill, 2012) 
Tell It Slant: Writing & Shaping Creative Nonfiction with coauthor Brenda Miller.  (trade edition, McGraw-Hill, 2004)
Tell It Slant: Writing & Shaping Creative Nonfiction with coauthor Brenda Miller. (McGraw-Hill, 2003)

See also

 Rachel Carson
 Sandra Steingraber
 Radium Girls

References

External links
 Bookreporter.aol.com – Body Toxic Chapter One (excerpt)
 Gelmans.com – 'Woman Looks Back at Her Toxic N.J. Youth', Candy J. Cooper (February 20, 2002)
 NYTimes.com – 'Poison: The author recounts how she was shaped by a girlhood that was, quite literally, toxic', reviewed by Michael Pollan, New York Times (June 24, 2001)
  SpiritualityandPractice.com – Body Toxic: An Environmental Memoir, reviewed by Frederic and Mary Ann Brussat
 TidePool.org – Body Toxic: An Environmental Memoir, reviewed by Christian Martin (2001)

1956 births
Living people
American essayists
American women essayists
People from New Jersey
American women poets
21st-century American memoirists
American women memoirists
Oberlin College alumni
Poets from Georgia (U.S. state)
People with bipolar disorder
American Book Award winners
21st-century American women